Legislative Assembly elections were held in the Indian state of Punjab in 1992 to elect the members of the Punjab Legislative Assembly. Chief Minister Beant Singh (Chief Minister) was elected as the leader of the ruling party.

Voter turnout

Urban-Rural turnout 1992 

SOURCE : India Today, 15 March 1992

Participating Parties

List of Participating Political Parties in Punjab Assembly Election in 1992

Results 
The election results were declared with the Indian National Congress winning an absolute majority of 87 seats out of 117.

|- align=center
!style="background-color:#E9E9E9" class="unsortable"|
!style="background-color:#E9E9E9" align=center|Political Party
!style="background-color:#E9E9E9" |No. of Candidates
!style="background-color:#E9E9E9" |Seats won
!style="background-color:#E9E9E9" |Number of Votes
!style="background-color:#E9E9E9" |% of Votes
|-
| 
|align="left"|Indian National Congress||116||87||13,17,075||43.83%
|-
| 
|align="left"|Shiromani Akali Dal||58||3||1,56,171||5.20%
|-
| 
|align="left"|Bharatiya Janata Party||66||6||4,95,161||16.48%
|-
| 
|align="left"|Communist Party of India||20||4||1,09,386||3.64%
|-
| 
|align="left"|Bahujan Samaj Party||105||9||4,90,552||17.59%
|-
| 
|align="left"|Communist Party of India (M)||17||1||72,061||2.40%
|-
|
|align="left"|Indian People's Front||2||1||2,292||0.08%
|-
| 
|align="left"|Janata Dal||37||1||64,666||2.15%
|-
| 
|align="left"|Independents||151||4||2,77,706||9.24%
|-
|
|align="left"|Total||579||117|| 30,05,083||
|-
|}

Results by Region

Result by Constituency

See also
Politics of Punjab, India

References

External links
Punjab Assembly Election Results in 1992

1992 State Assembly elections in India
1992
1992